Schizothorax oconnori is a species of ray-finned fish in the genus Schizothorax from the upper Brahmaputra River drainage in Tibet.

References 

Schizothorax
Fish described in 1908